The First United Methodist Church  is a historic site in Kissimmee, Florida. It is located at 101 W Dakin Ave. On January 3, 1994, it was added to the U.S. National Register of Historic Places.

References

External links
 Osceola County listings at National Register of Historic Places
 First United Methodist Church at Florida's Office of Cultural and Historical Programs
First United Methodist Church, official site

Churches on the National Register of Historic Places in Florida
Churches in Osceola County, Florida
United Methodist churches in Florida
Buildings and structures in Kissimmee, Florida
National Register of Historic Places in Osceola County, Florida